The BAaer Gurí is an Argentine ultralight aircraft, designed and produced by BAaer (BA-Aeroplanos) of Buenos Aires. When it was available the aircraft was supplied as a kit for amateur construction.

Design and development
The Gurí was designed as a simple, low cost aircraft to comply with the Fédération Aéronautique Internationale microlight rules. It features a strut-braced high-wing, a two-seats-in-side-by-side configuration semi-enclosed cockpit, fixed conventional landing gear and a single engine in tractor configuration.

The aircraft is made from a mix of aluminum tubing and fiberglass, with its flying surfaces covered in Dacron sailcloth. Its  span wing employs V-struts and jury struts. Standard engines used are the  Rotax 503, the  Rotax 582 two-stroke engine, the  Rotax 912UL and the  HKS 700E four-stroke powerplant.

Specifications (Gurí)

References

External links

BAaer aircraft
1990s Argentine ultralight aircraft
Homebuilt aircraft
Single-engined tractor aircraft